Phylloxiphia illustris is a moth of the family Sphingidae. It is known from lowland forest from Liberia to the Congo and western Uganda.

The length of the forewings is 27–29 mm. The forewings and body are straw-coloured. The forewing has a number of irregular, dark transverse lines. The fringe is dark brown. The hindwings are strongly produced at the tornus and pinkish red, although the tornal area is straw-coloured.

References

Phylloxiphia
Moths described in 1906
Moths of Africa
Insects of the Democratic Republic of the Congo
Insects of West Africa
Insects of Uganda
Fauna of the Central African Republic
Fauna of Gabon